The 2019–20 Louisiana–Monroe women's basketball team represented the University of Louisiana at Monroe in the 2019–20 NCAA Division I women's basketball season. The Warhawks, led by first year head coach Brooks Donald-Williams, played their home games at Fant–Ewing Coliseum and were members of the Sun Belt Conference. They finished the season 3–26, 1–17 in Sun Belt play to finish in dead-last twelfth place. They failed to qualify for the Sun Belt women's tournament.

This was Donald-Williams' first season at the helm of the Warhawks teams following the firing of Jeff Dow in March 2019. She came to Louisiana–Monroe after assistant stints at Alabama, Southern Miss, Memphis, and Arkansas–Little Rock and a nine-year stint at the helm of McNeese State's program including four 20+ win seasons, two conference tournament championships, and one regular season championship at McNeese.

Preseason

Sun Belt coaches poll
On October 30, 2019, the Sun Belt released their preseason coaches poll with the Chanticleers predicted to finish in seventh place in the conference.

Sun Belt Preseason All-Conference team
No Louisiana–Monroe members were chosen to the preseason team.

Roster

Schedule

|-
!colspan=9 style=| Exhibition

|-
!colspan=9 style=| Non-conference regular season

|-
!colspan=9 style=| Exhibition

|-
!colspan=9 style=| Non-conference regular season

|-
!colspan=9 style=| Sun Belt regular season

See also
2019–20 Louisiana–Monroe Warhawks men's basketball team

References

External links

Louisiana–Monroe Warhawks women's basketball seasons
Louisiana-Monroe